Rhodolaena macrocarpa is a tree in the family Sarcolaenaceae. It is endemic to Madagascar. The specific epithet  is from the Latin meaning "large-fruited".

Description
The branches are glabrous. The fruit is the largest of the genus.

Distribution and habitat
Rhodolaena macrocarpa is known only from the northern region of Sava. Its habitat is humid evergreen forest at around  altitude.

Threats
Rhodolaena macrocarpa is threatened by timber exploitation. Future population decline of the tree due to habitat loss is predicted at greater than 80%. The single population of the species is not in a protected area. The conservation status of the species is endangered.

References

macrocarpa
Endemic flora of Madagascar
Trees of Madagascar
Plants described in 2000